Bryan Michael Bertino (born October 17, 1977) is an American filmmaker. He is best known as the writer/director of The Strangers (2008), as well as writing its sequel, The Strangers: Prey at Night (2018), with Ben Ketai.

Background and education
Bertino was born in Crowley, Texas. He studied cinematography at the University of Texas at Austin. He then moved to Los Angeles, where he worked as a gaffer, and wrote screenplays in his spare time.

Career
Bertino submitted The Strangers for a Nicholl Fellowship with the Academy of Motion Picture Arts and Sciences, which reached the quarterfinals. However, he was able to get a meeting with Vertigo Entertainment. Bertino quit his job days before the script was sold to Universal Studios.

Mark Romanek wanted to direct The Strangers but demanded a $40 million budget. After speaking with Andrew Rona at Rogue Pictures, Bertino was asked to direct The Strangers despite a lack of directorial experience.

Filmography

This Man
In 2010, Bertino announced he was working on the thriller or horror film This Man, which was being produced by Sam Raimi and his company Ghost House Pictures. The film is about a mysterious man's face appearing in the dreams of many individuals.

Concept
The film concept is built upon the internet meme that appeared in October 2009, with the launching of the website ThisMan.org. The site claimed that the first recorded sighting of the individual was in 2006 to an anonymous mental patient and that others throughout the world have seen This Man in their dreams.  Shortly after the website launch, it was revealed that the website and meme were created by sociologist Andrea Natella, an advertising agency employee who specialized in hoax and viral marketing, and that the face used on the website appeared to have been produced through the software program Flash Face.

Production
ThisMan.org was  purchased in May 2010 by Ghost House Pictures, who announced that they were writing and directing a film about This Man, with Bertino contracted as writer/director. Though Bertino worked on other projects, This Man hasn't been mentioned since then.

References

External links
 

1977 births
Living people
People from Crowley, Texas
American male screenwriters
Moody College of Communication alumni
Film directors from Texas
Film producers from Texas
Horror film directors
Screenwriters from Texas
21st-century American screenwriters
21st-century American male writers